Table tennis at the 2004 Summer Olympics took place in the Galatsi Olympic Hall with 172 competitors in 4 events.

Participating nations
A total of 172 athletes (86 men and 86 women), representing 50 NOCs, competed in four events.

Medal summary

Medal table

References

External links
Official result book – Table Tennis

 
2004 Summer Olympics events
2004
2004 in table tennis
Table tennis competitions in Greece
Galatsi Olympic Hall events